Chitral District was the largest district in the Khyber-Pakhtunkhwa  province of Pakistan, covering an area of 14,850 km², before splitting into Upper Chitral District and Lower Chitral District in 2018. Part of the Malakand Division, it is the northernmost district of Pakistan.
It shares a border with Gilgit-Baltistan to the east, with Kunar, Badakshan and Nuristan provinces of Afghanistan to the north and west, and with the Khyber-Pakhtunkhwa districts of Swat and Dir to the south. A narrow strip of Wakhan Corridor separates Chitral from Tajikistan in the north.

History 

Chitral shares much of its history and culture with the neighboring Hindu Kush territories of Gilgit-Baltistan, a region sometimes called "Peristan" because of the common belief in fairies (peri) inhabiting the high mountains.

The entire region that now forms the Chitral District was an independent monarchical state until 1895, when the British negotiated a treaty with its hereditary ruler, the Mehtar, under which Chitral became a semi-autonomous princely state within the Indian Empire. Chitral retained this status even after its accession to Pakistan in 1947, finally being made an administrative district of Pakistan in 1969, disestablishing the Princely state.

Topography and access 
Chitral is counted amongst the highest regions of the world, sweeping from 1,094 meters at Arandu to 7,726 meters at Tirichmir, and packing over 40 peaks more than 6,100 meters in height. The terrain of Chitral is  very mountainous and Tirich Mir (25,289 feet) the highest peak of the Hindu Kush, rises in the north of the district. Around 4.8 per cent of the land is covered by forest and 76 per cent is mountains and glaciers.

Chitral is connected to the rest of Pakistan by two major road routes, the Lowari Pass (el. 10,230 ft.) from Dir and Shandur Top (elevation 12,200 ft.) from Gilgit. Both routes used to be closed in winter, but circa 2017 the highway Lowari Tunnel under the Lowari Pass opened to vehicular traffic for at least ten hours per day.  A number of other high passes, including Darkot Pass, Thoi Pass and Zagaran Pass, provide access on foot to Chitral from Gilgit-Baltistan.
 Arandu Pass, on the border between Pakistan and Afghanistan
 Broghol Pass, on the border between Pakistan and Afghanistan
 Dorah Pass, on the border between Pakistan and Afghanistan
 Darkot Pass, on the border between Chitral and Gupis-Yasin District
 Shandur Pass, on the border between Chitral and Gilgit-Baltistan
 Lowari Pass, on the border between Chitral and upper Dir
 Lowari Tunnel, highway under Lowari Pass
 Thoi Pass, on the border between Chitral and Gilgit-Baltistan
 Zagaran Pass, on the border between Chitral and Gilgit-Baltistan

Demographics 
The district has a population of about 414,000. The general population is mainly of the Kho people, who speak the Khowar, which is also spoken in parts of Yasin, Gilgit, Dir and Swat. Chitral is also home to the Kalash tribe, who live in Bumburet and two other remote valleys southwest of Chitral town. A few thousand Nuristani people are also known to live in Chitral.

The main language of the region is Khowar. There are also smaller communities of speakers of Dameli, Gawar-Bati, Gojri, Kalasha, Kyrgyz, Kataviri/Kamviri, Mdaglashti Dari, Palula, Sariquli, Wakhi, and Yidgha. Urdu has official status.

Chitral Town 

The town of Chitral is the main town in the district and serves as its capital. It is situated on the west bank of the Chitral River (also known as the Kunar River) at the foot of Tirich Mir which at 7,708 m (25,289 ft) is the highest peak of the Hindu Kush. Until 1969, it served as the capital of the princely state of Chitral.

Administration 
The district of Chitral is divided into twenty-four union councils and two tehsils:

 Chitral
 Mastuj

National Assembly 
This district is represented by one elected MNA (Member of National Assembly) in Pakistan National Assembly. Its constituency is NA-32.

Provincial Assembly 

The district is represented by two elected MPAs in the provincial assembly who represent the following constituencies:

 PK-89 (Chitral-I)
 PK-90 (Chitral-II)

See also 

 Chitral National Park
 Broghil Valley National Park

 Upper Dir District
 Lower Dir District
 Swat District

 Kunar Province
 Nuristan Province
 Badakhshan Province

References

External links 
 Municipal Website